Calceolispongia (literally "shoe sponge") is a diverse genus of cladid crinoids that lived along the shores of eastern Pangaea that correspond to Timor and Western Australia, today.

When the first fossils were discovered, they were mistakenly thought to be sponges, hence the generic name.  Later, similarly shaped fossils were found, and (correctly) identified as those of a crinoid, and named "Dinocrinus." ("Terrible Lily") It was soon realized that Dinocrinus and Calceolispongia were the same, and Dinocrinus is now regarded as a junior synonym.

References 

Cladida
Permian crinoids
Prehistoric crinoid genera
Prehistoric echinoderms of Oceania